Big Sky is the debut studio album by Canadian country music group One More Girl. It was released on October 6, 2009 by EMI Music Canada. The album features songs written by Matraca Berg, Gretchen Wilson and Victoria Banks.

Track listing

Charts

Singles

References

2009 debut albums
One More Girl albums
EMI Records albums